Tamerville  is a commune in the Manche department in Normandy in north-western France.

The Manoir de Bellauney, a chateau dating back to the 15th century, is now a hotel.

References

See also
Communes of the Manche department

Communes of Manche